Kaduney-e Vosta (also Romanized as Kādūney-e Vosţá; also known as Delbar Sādāt-e Vosţá and Delbar Sādāt) is a village in Veysian Rural District, Veysian District, Dowreh County, Lorestan Province, Iran. At the 2006 census, its population was 110, in 23 families.

References 

Towns and villages in Dowreh County